Fernanda Arrieta (born 27 January 2001) is a field hockey player from Chile, who plays as a forward.

Career

Las Diablas
Fernanda Arrieta received her first call up to the national team in 2018 during a tour to the United States and Canada in 2018.

In 2019, Arrieta made her debut for Las Diablas during a test series against Ireland in Santiago. Following her debut, Arrieta represented Chile at her first major tournament, the FIH Series Finals in Hiroshima, winning a bronze medal.

Arrieta returned to the international fold in 2020, with appearances in a January test series against Japan in Santiago.

International goals

References

External links

2001 births
Living people
Chilean female field hockey players
Female field hockey forwards
Sportspeople from Santiago
Competitors at the 2022 South American Games
South American Games gold medalists for Chile
South American Games medalists in field hockey
21st-century Chilean women